The Provincetown Post Office is located at 217 Commercial Street in Provincetown, Massachusetts.  It is located in a -story brick building that was built in 1930.  The main facade has a loggia-style arcade of three arches on the first level, leading to a recessed entrance.  The second story has three large windows across, and the gable end has an oculus window and dentil moulding.  The building is crowned by a cupola.

The building was listed on the National Register of Historic Places in 1987.

See also 

National Register of Historic Places listings in Barnstable County, Massachusetts
List of United States post offices

References 

1930 establishments in Massachusetts
Buildings and structures in Barnstable County, Massachusetts
Government buildings completed in 1930
National Register of Historic Places in Barnstable County, Massachusetts
Provincetown
Provincetown, Massachusetts